BC Titebi Tbilisi is the Georgian professional basketball club, that is based in Tbilisi, Georgia. The club competes in the Georgian basketball Super Liga.

History 
The club was established by the Georgian basketball players and Georgia national basketball team members Giorgi Gamqrelidze and Besik Lezhava in 2016. 

In 2018, the club was promoted to the Superliga after beating Sokhumi in the promotion/relegation playoffs.
  
In 2019, Titebi won the Georgian Cup after beating Mgzavrebi in the Finals 95-85, becoming the first team in Georgian basketball history to achieve this feat in their first season in the top flight of Georgian Basketball.

Honours
Georgian Cup
Winners (1): 2019

Team

Current roster

Notable players 
 Ilia Londaridze
 Giorgi Sharabidze
 Nika Metreveli
 Richard Matiashvili
 Besik Lezhava
 Giorgi Gamqrelidze
    Joel Almeida

Coaches 
 Ambrosi Ormotsadze —  2016-2017
 Davit Ustiashvili —  2017-2018
 Giorgi Gamqrelidze —  2018-2019

References

External links
Eurobasket.com Team Profile
GBF Team Profile

Basketball teams in Georgia (country)
Basketball teams established in 2016
Sport in Tbilisi